D'Hondt Motorsports was a NASCAR Nationwide Series and ARCA team owned by Hendrick Motorsports spotter Eddie D'Hondt. The team most notably fielded the Nos. 90 and 91 cars in 2010. Owner Eddie D’Hondt began a career in NASCAR in 1981 driving Street Stocks at Islip and Riverhead Speedways on Long Island, NY. In 1986, he moved to the NASCAR Modified touring Series, then moving South to Charlotte, NC in 1996 to begin a career in NASCAR Winston Cup Racing Series beginning his Cup career working for famed owner; Harry Ranier. After climbing his way up within the Cup series, managing & owning teams, he now serves as a full time spotter for HENDRICK Motorsports and the number 9 Cup team.

NASCAR 
D'Hondt entered NASCAR in 2007 as a partner in Riley-D'Hondt Motorsports with Bill and Bob Riley and Jim Matthews as co-owners. They made their debut at Richmond International Raceway in the Busch Series with Bobby Santos III qualifying seventh in the No. 91 Toyota Camry and finishing thirtieth. David Green drove the next three races in the 91 and had a best finish of eleventh before Santos drove the car at Loudon, starting 4th and finishing 33rd. Santos also drove two races in a second car, the No. 92, in two races but did not finish either of them. In addition, Marc Goossens drove in the Sprint Cup Series at Infineon Raceway, where he finished 36th. After the season, Riley left leaving D'Hondt as the sole owner. The team's only start in 2008 came at Watkins Glen International, where Kyle Busch finished second in the No. 92 Zippo Toyota.

In 2010, D'Hondt formed a partnership with Randy Humphrey of Prism Motorsports and fielded two Nationwide entries that were owned by MSRP Motorsports, Prism's former nome de pleur. Danny O'Quinn, Jr. drove the No. 90 for 20 races and David Gilliland drove the No. 91 for 16 races, with Chase Miller driving the car for 7 races. Both teams started and parked for the season. Following the 2010 season, the team was not heard from again.

ARCA 
On October 24, 2008, D'Hondt Motorsports announced 20-year-old female Alli Owens would drive for them part-time in the ARCA RE/MAX Series in 2009 with sponsorship from ElectrifyingCareers.com. Owens had career best finishes in 9 of the 10 races she ran for the team then left to join another team in October 2009.

On September 10, 2009 D'Hondt Motorsports announced that they would be running the ARCA RE/MAX Series race at Rockingham Speedway on October 11, debuting 17-year-old Johanna Long, sponsored by Grandma Ruby's. They also announced that Owens would not be returning in 2010.

External links 
 

American auto racing teams
Defunct NASCAR teams
ARCA Menards Series teams
Auto racing teams established in 2006
Auto racing teams disestablished in 2010
2006 establishments in North Carolina